Kannadadda Kiran Bedi (alternatively spelled as Kannadada Kiran Bedi) is a 2009 Kannada action drama film starring Malashri in the lead role with Srinivasa Murthy, Rangayana Raghu and Ashish Vidyarthi in pivotal roles. The film released on 27 March to mixed reviews. The film recorded as Hit at the box-office. The film has also been dubbed into Hindi as Mumbai Ki Kiran Bedi, in Telugu as Andhra Kiran Bedi, in Tamil as "Tamil Kiran Bedi" and in Malayalam as Kerala KiranBedi.

Plot
A police constable, Venkatappa (Srinivasa Murthy) meets Bellary Bhagyalakshmi (Malashri), a fraud and tells her his daughter, Kiran Bedi's (Malashri) story. Kiran was a police officer in Bangalore and resembled Bellary. There is a crime nexus run by Bhoopathy (Ashish Vidyarthi), his partners Naga (Kote), Mobile Nachappa (Rangayana Raghu), D'Souza and Muni in Bangalore. Bhoopathy's son Vicky murders a young civil service student, Shweta. Bhoopathy hides Vicky in Bhadramma's (Telangana Shakuntala) house in Madurai, Tamil Nadu. Kiran finds Vicky and kills him and Bhadramma. Bhoopathy, in a fit of rage, manages to kill Kiran. Venkatappa now requests Bellary to become Kiran Bedi and finish Bhoopathy and his associates. Bellary accepts after listening to the story and getting money for it. Bellary targets the whole nexus of Bhoopathy and slowly starts taking them down. But soon Bellary's identity is revealed in the court. Full of remorse, she enters civil services and becomes a real police officer finishing Bhoopathy.

Cast
 Malashri as Kiran Bedi/Bellary Bhagyalakshmi
 Srinivasa Murthy as Constable Venkatappa
 Ashish Vidyarthi as Bhoopathy
 Rangayana Raghu as Mobile Nachappa
 Telangana Shakuntala as Bhadramma
 Kote as Naga
 Sayaji Shinde

Reception

Critical reception
The film received mixed reviews.

The Times of India  said "It is a feast for Malashri fans and those who like action movies. It is a treat to watch her in a double role -- fighting rowdies, chasing cars, shooting underworld dons and helping good Samaritans for a crime-free society". BharatStudent gave 2.5 of 5 stars and stated " While the first half goes about with punch dialogues and action sequences, the second half gets emotional but culminates to the mass track with the high energy dialogues and some good comedy".Sify wrote "The songs in the background written and composed by Hamsalekha are very meaningful and rise to the occasion. KM Vishuvardhana camera work is splendid. The capturing of many action scenes is not an easy task. Action lovers this is a festival treat!"  R G Vijayasarathy of Rediff.com scored the film at 2 out of 5 stars and says "Camera work is another highlight of the film. Hamsalekha shines in the background score though the lyrics tend to get drowned in the music. In a nutshell, go watch Kiran Bedi for Malashri's breathtaking stunts."

Box-office
The film was rated as a hit at the box-office.

References

2000s Kannada-language films
2000s masala films
Indian action films
Films directed by Om Prakash Rao
Films scored by Hamsalekha
2009 action films
2009 films